Delias lativitta is a butterfly in the family Pieridae. It was described by John Henry Leech in 1893 . It is found in the Indomalayan realm.

The wingspan is about 83–100 mm for males and 102–104 mm for females. Adults may be distinguished by the white cell patch on the upperside of the hindwings.

Subspecies
 D. l. lativitta (Kanding, W. Sichuan, China)
 D. l. formosana Matsumura, 1909 (China, Taiwan)
 D. l. parva Talbot, 1937 (Bhutan)
 D. l. naga Tytler, 1939 (Nagaland, N.E. India)
 D. l. yunnana Talbot, 1937 (Weixi, N.Yunnan, China)
 D. l. tongi Mell, 1938 (Kuatun, north-western Fujian, China)
 D. l. tai Yoshino, 1999 (Xishuangbanna, S.Yunnan, China)
 D. l. batangensis Yoshino, 2022 (Batang, Far W. Sichuan, China)
 D. l. shaanxiensis Chou, Zhang & Wang 2001 (Shaanxi, China)
 D. l. nepalica Katayama, 2017 (Nepal)

References

External links
Delias at Markku Savela's Lepidoptera and Some Other Life Forms
Delias lativitta at Olivier Pequin's Delias of the World

lativitta
Butterflies described in 1893